The Ambassador from Israel to the United Kingdom is Israel's foremost diplomatic representative in the United Kingdom. The Ambassador is based in the Embassy of Israel, London.

Ambassadors
1949–1950: Mordechai Ali'ash
1950–1959: Eliahu Eilat
1960–1965: Arthur Lurie
1965–1970: Aharon Remez
1970–1973: Michael Comay
1973–1977: Gideon Rafael
1977–1979: Avraham Kidron
1979–1982: Shlomo Argov
1983–1988: Yehuda Avner
1988–1993: Yoav Biran
1993–1998: Moshe Raviv
1998–2000: Dror Zeigerman
2001–2004: Zvi Stauber
2004–2007: Zvi Heifetz
2007–2011: Ron Prosor
2011–2015: Daniel Taub

2016–2020: Mark Regev
2020-present: Tzipi Hotovely

See also
 Israel–United Kingdom relations

References 

United Kingdom, Ambassadors from Israel to
 
Israel